Lagos Rail Mass Transit is a rapid transit system in Lagos State. The rail system is managed by the Lagos Metropolitan Area Transport Authority (LAMATA). The railway equipment including electric power, signals, rolling stock, and fare collection equipment will be provided by the private sector under a concession contract. LAMATA is responsible for policy direction, regulation, and infrastructure for the network. The first section of the network, Phase I of the Blue Line, was originally planned to be completed in 2011, though the construction has suffered many delays caused by shortage of funds and change of government. In February 2021, the Lagos State Government announced that the Blue and Red Lines would be open by December 2022 but Blue Line is now planned to open in Spring 2023.

Timeline 
 2008: A metro is proposed for Lagos, allegedly with a completion date of 2011.
 2009: Construction commences on the Blue Line.
 2016: Phase I (the Blue Line from Marina to Mile 2) planned to open in December 2016.
 2018: After an Alstom review of the project, Phase I (the Blue Line from Marina to Mile 2) is now set to open in 2021.
 2021: The Lagos State Government announced that the Blue and Red Lines will open in December 2022.
 2022, January: LAMATA purchases two Talgo VIII trains.
 On Jan 24, 2023, President Muhammadu Buhari inaugurated the first phase of the Lagos Mass Transit Blue Line Rail Project.

History
The idea of developing a rapid transit in Lagos state, dates back to 1983 with the Lagos Metroline network conceived by Alhaji Lateef Jakande during the Second Nigerian Republic. The initial Metroline project was scrapped in 1985 by Muhammadu Buhari at a loss of over $78 million to the state tax payers. In  year 2003,the then governor, Bola Tinubu, revived the rail network for Lagos state with a formal announcement of its construction. The initial cost $135 million was proposed for the greater Lagos Urban Transportation Project to be implemented by the newly formed Lagos Metropolitan Area Transport Authority (LAMATA). LAMATA initially concentrated on developing a Bus Rapid Transit system, running from Mile 12 to Lagos Island. In 2008, LAMATA to make progress with the rail project, focusing on the Blue Line and the Red Line.

Rolling stock

In September 2011, LAMATA announced that it would acquire some H5-series subway trains formerly used by the Toronto Transit Commission (TTC). The cars were to be refurbished in the United States and converted to standard gauge before being imported and put into service on the Blue and Red lines. The same contract also included an option for some H6-series subway cars from the TTC, however this has since been cancelled. The trains were built as two-unit married pairs with a driver's cab in the front right corner of each car.

In January 2015, LAMATA opted for Chinese-built trains instead, ordering 15 electro-diesel multiple units from CNR Dalian with an option for 14 more. About 76 H5 cars that had been taken for refurbishment to Buffalo, New York, have been scrapped by August 2015.

In August 2018, LAMATA signed an agreement with Alstom. As a part of the agreement, Alstom conducted a review of the rail lines. After the review of the rail project, which should have initiated passenger activity, the state government said the Blue Line, would now be ready for passenger operation by 2022. This deal also plans for the electrification of a portion of the track.

In January 2022, Governor Babajide Sanwo-Olu visited the US state of Wisconsin, to announce the purchase of two Talgo VIII trainsets for service on the Red Line. They had been ordered by Wisconsin for use on the Amtrak Hiawatha Service in 2009, but they were never placed in service, and were instead stored. Talgo VIII cars are based on the unique technology of the Talgo Pendular model, which (similar to a bicycle rider) leans into a curve resulting in less sideways force and a higher comfort for passengers when driving over a curvy track. The "leaning" of the car is passive e.g. it happens purely by the resulting force, without electronics, sensors or engines.

Routes

Blue Line: Okokomaiko - Marina

The Blue Line is  an under construction line that has been partially opened. Construction had been delayed due to lack of funds, however as of January 2023 the first phase of the line is undergoing testing with a view to allowing passenger service.

The Red Line: Agbado - Marina
The second line, the Red Line, will run from Marina to Agbado. The line will share the right-of-way of the Lagos–Kano Standard Gauge Railway. The Lagos State government purchased Talgo trainsets for use on the Red Line from Wisconsin, United States of America, where they were built and purchased for service between Milwaukee and Madison, but never used.

The Red Line [Airport Branch] 
The Airport Branch of the Red Line runs from Ikeja to MMIA International Terminal

See also

 LAMATA
 Abuja Light Rail
 Rail Transportation in Nigeria
 Rapid transit
 Lagos Bus Rapid Transit System
 Lagos State Ferry Services Corporation

References

External links
 Subways.net Lagos Rail Mass Transit
 RGI
 Urbanrail.net

Lagos Metropolitan Area Transport Authority
Rapid transit in Nigeria
Public transport in Lagos
Transport infrastructure under construction in Nigeria
Projects established in 1983
Rail infrastructure in Lagos